Fierzë is a village and a former municipality in the Shkodër County, northwestern Albania. At the 2015 local government reform it became a subdivision of the municipality Fushë-Arrëz. The population at the 2011 census was 1,302. The former municipality (now an administrative unit) has an area of 81.19 km2. It lies on the left, southern bank of the river Drin, opposite the village Fierzë in Tropojë municipality.

Settlements 
There are 8 settlements within Fierzë:
 Aprip-Guri
 Arst
 Bugjon
 Fierzë
 Kokdodë
 Mëzi
 Miliska
 Porav

References 

Administrative units of Fushë-Arrëz
Former municipalities in Shkodër County
Villages in Shkodër County